The government consists of the prime minister and 14 ministers. The government is led by Prime Minister Kaja Kallas, who has been in office since 26 January 2021.

Current Prime Minister

Current ministries and ministers

References